Genset or generator set may refer to:

 Diesel generator, a combination of diesel engine and electric generator
 Engine-generator, a machine used to generate electricity
 Fuel cell, a machine used to generate electricity
 Genset Corporation, a French biotechnology company
 Genset locomotive, a railway locomotive using multiple engine-generators per vehicle for traction power
 Genset trailer, a range extending trailer for battery electric vehicles consisting of an internal combustion engine and an electric generator
 Portaset, as EP Tender, a portable battery set to extend electric vehicle range